Michelle Kay "Shelley" Fruin (born 31 December 1961) is a New Zealand former cricketer who played as a wicket-keeper and right-handed batter. She appeared in 6 Test matches and 23 One Day Internationals for New Zealand between 1992 and 1997. Her final WODI appearance was in the final of the 1997 Women's Cricket World Cup. She played domestic cricket for Auckland.

References

External links

1961 births
Living people
People from Pukekohe
New Zealand women cricketers
New Zealand women Test cricketers
New Zealand women One Day International cricketers
Auckland Hearts cricketers